was a Japanese politician serving in the Diet (national legislature) as a member of the House of Representatives for Kumamoto 4th district; following the 2017 general election when Kumamoto lost one seat due to reapportionment, he moved to the Kyūshū proportional representation block. He was a member of the Liberal Democratic Party (LDP), previous party affiliations have been independent→LDP→New Party Sakigake→Independent→LDP→Sunrise Party of Japan→Sunrise Party→Japan Restoration Party→Party for Future Generations→Sunrise Party→Party for Future Generations→LDP.

Career

A native of Amakusa District, Kumamoto and graduate of Nihon University, Sonoda was elected for the first time in 1986, when he ran for his father's seat in Kumamoto Prefecture's 2nd district, a five-member district at the time. His father, the Foreign Minister Sunao Sonoda, died in 1984.

Hiroyuki Sonoda joined the Sunrise Party of Japan on April 10, 2010. The Sunrise Party merged with the Japan Restoration Party in 2012. In 2014 the former Sunrise Party members including Sonoda split away to form the Party for Future Generations.

Hiroyuki Sonoda was affiliated to the openly revisionist lobby Nippon Kaigi, and his late step-mother Tenkoko Sonoda (the second wife and the widow of his father) was a member of its representative committee.

Death 
Sonoda died of pneumonia on November 11, 2018.

References

External links
 Official website 
 House of Representatives: Members biographic summaries, Sonoda Hiroyuki 
 Liberal Democratic Party: Members of the Diet, Sonoda Hiroyuki  (English, Japanese)

Members of the House of Representatives (Japan)
Liberal Democratic Party (Japan) politicians
Sunrise Party politicians
Members of Nippon Kaigi
1942 births
2018 deaths
Nihon University alumni
Party for Japanese Kokoro politicians
21st-century Japanese politicians
Deaths from pneumonia in Japan
Hiroyuki